opened in  Iida, Nagano Prefecture, Japan in 1989. The museum's collections and display relate to the natural history, history, and art of the area and include a number of works by Hishida Shunsō, who was born locally.

See also

 Nagano Prefectural Museum of History

References

External links
  Iida City Museum

Museums in Nagano Prefecture
Iida, Nagano
Museums established in 1989
1989 establishments in Japan